Paulo Marcel Pereira Merabet (born 22 February 1979 in Belém, Pará), commonly known as Roma, is a Brazilian retired footballer who played as a forward.

References

External links

1979 births
Living people
Sportspeople from Belém
Brazilian footballers
Association football forwards
Campeonato Brasileiro Série A players
Campeonato Brasileiro Série C players
Clube do Remo players
CR Flamengo footballers
Brasiliense Futebol Clube players
Marília Atlético Clube players
Santa Cruz Futebol Clube players
Boa Esporte Clube players
Macaé Esporte Futebol Clube players
Salgueiro Atlético Clube players
Águia de Marabá Futebol Clube players
Al-Nasr SC (Salalah) players
K League 1 players
Jeonbuk Hyundai Motors players
Belgian Pro League players
K.S.C. Lokeren Oost-Vlaanderen players
Club Universidad Nacional footballers
Primeira Liga players
C.F. Os Belenenses players
Kategoria Superiore players
FK Partizani Tirana players
Brazilian expatriate footballers
Expatriate footballers in Oman
Expatriate footballers in South Korea
Expatriate footballers in Belgium
Expatriate footballers in Mexico
Expatriate footballers in Portugal
Expatriate footballers in Albania
Brazilian expatriate sportspeople in South Korea